Amazing Hotels: Life Beyond the Lobby is a British BBC documentary television series, presented by the journalist Giles Coren and the chef Monica Galetti, and started in 2017.

Each programme in the series is based on a luxury hotel. The presenters take a hands-on approach, investigating the running of the hotel, hence the subtitle of the series. The programmes are shown on BBC Two.

The fourth series ran in 2021.

On 31 October 2022, the BBC announced that Rob Rinder will be the series' new co-presenter replacing Giles Coren who left after series four.

Featured hotels

Featured hotels include the following:

Series 1 (2017)
 Marina Bay Sands, Singapore
 Mashpi Lodge, Ecuador
 Giraffe Manor, Kenya
 Royal Mansour, Marrakesh, Morocco
 Fogo Island Inn, Fogo Island, Canada
 ICEHOTEL, Sweden

Series 2 (2018)
 The Brando Resort, French Polynesia
 Anantara Al Jabal Al Akhdar, Oman
 Grand Resort Bad Ragaz, Switzerland
 Ashford Castle, Ireland
 The Silo, South Africa
 Haciendra Vira Vira, Chile
  St Moritz, Switzerland

Series 3 (2021)
 MGM Cotai, Macau
 The Torridon, Scotland, United Kingdom
 Schloss Elmau, Germany
 Jade Mountain, St Lucia
 Swinton Estate, Yorkshire, United Kingdom
 Shangri-La, The Shard, London, United Kingdom

Series 4 (2021–22)
 ION Adventure Hotel, Iceland
 Reid's Palace, Madeira
 Grand Park Rovinj, Croatia
 Nimb Hotel, Copenhagen, Denmark
 Qasr Al Sarab Desert Resort, Abu Dhabi, United Arab Emirates
 The Lanesborough, London, England, United Kingdom

References

External links
 Amazing Hotels: Life Beyond the Lobby from the BBC
 

2017 British television series debuts
2010s British documentary television series
2020s British documentary television series
BBC television documentaries
 Amazing Hotels Life Beyond the Lobby